State Route 118 (SR 118) is a state highway in Churchill County, Nevada.  It serves the southeast portion of Fallon near northern edge of Naval Air Station Fallon. Prior to 1976, the route was designated as State Route 62.

Route description

State Route 118 has its western terminus at the intersection of Harrigan Road and Wildes Road, near the southeastern city limits of Fallon. From there, the route heads east along Wildes Road, through predominantly agricultural areas. The route curves southeastward, and turns east again after its intersection with Pasture Road. At this point, the highway follows the northern perimeter of Naval Air Station Fallon.

History
Wildes Road appears on maps dating back to at least 1937. State Route 62 first appeared on state highway maps in 1948, and was defined in state law (as of 1951) as "Beginning...approximately one mile south of Fallon, thence easterly one mile; thence southeasterly approximately two miles." SR 62 was shown following Wildes Road as the current route does today by 1957.

In the mid 1970s, Nevada began renumbering their state highway system. Old SR 62 became State Route 118 on July 1, 1976. The route has remained relatively unchanged since.

At one point, the route may have been part of an alignment of US 50.

Major intersections

See also

References

118
Transportation in Churchill County, Nevada